Derek Nolan (born October 1982) is a former Irish Labour Party politician who served as a Teachta Dála (TD) for the Galway West constituency from 2011 to 2016.

Nolan attended Saint Michael's Boys' School, Mervue, and St. Mary's College, Galway. He then studied at the University of Galway. He won a seat on Galway City Council in June 2009, aged 26. He was a trainee Solicitor when he contested the 2011 general election. He was nominated to succeed President Michael D. Higgins in the election to Dáil Éireann, in Galway West as a first time candidate. He was a member of the Dáil Public Accounts Committee.

He lost his seat at the 2016 general election. He described the poor Labour result and loss of so many seats for party as "heartbreaking", but also said the challenge of starting a new career was "exciting".

References

 

1982 births
Living people
Alumni of the University of Galway
Labour Party (Ireland) TDs
Local councillors in Galway (city)
Members of the 31st Dáil
Politicians from County Galway